James C. Connell (September 20, 1897 – October 30, 1973) was a United States district judge of the United States District Court for the Northern District of Ohio.

Education and career

Born in Cleveland, Ohio, Connell received a Bachelor of Laws from John Marshall School of Law (now Cleveland–Marshall College of Law) in Cleveland in 1918. He was in private practice of law in Cleveland from 1918 to 1922. He was an assistant police prosecutor for the City of Cleveland from 1922 to 1923 and was an assistant county prosecutor of Cuyahoga County, Ohio from 1923 to 1928. He was in private practice of law in Cleveland from 1928 to 1941. He was a judge to the Cuyahoga County Court of Common Pleas from 1941 to 1954.

Federal judicial service

Confirmed by the Senate on August 10, 1954, and received his commission the same day. He served as Chief Judge from 1960 to 1967 and assumed senior status on September 21, 1971. He remained on the court until his death on October 30, 1973.

References

Sources
 

1897 births
1973 deaths
Ohio state court judges
Judges of the United States District Court for the Northern District of Ohio
United States district court judges appointed by Dwight D. Eisenhower
20th-century American judges
Lawyers from Cleveland
Cleveland–Marshall College of Law alumni